Al Ahly Women's Basketball (Arabic : ‍النادي الاهلي لكرة السلة للسيدات ) is a basketball club located in Cairo, Egypt that currently plays in the Egyptian Basketball League Top Division. The club, nicknamed The Red Devils, won the Arab Women's Club Basketball Championship in 1996. The club is also the 16-time winner of the Women's Egypt Basketball League and the 13-time winner of the Egypt Basketball Cup. The current club president is Mahmoud El Khatib.

Honours

Domestic Leagues 
Women's Egypt Basketball League: 24 wins (Record)
Winners  :1960–61, 1963–64, 1964–65, 1965–66, 1969–70, 1981–82, 1984–85, 1986–87, 1987–88, 1990–91, 1992–93 , 1993–94, 1994–95, 1995–96, 1996–97, 1997–98, 2001–02, 2002–03, 2003–04, 2006–07, 2007–08, 2017–18, 2018–19, 2019-2020
Egypt Basketball Cup: 15 wins
Winners  : 1982–83, 1985–86, 1994–95, 1995–96, 1997–98, 1999–00, 2000–01, 2001–02, 2003–04, 2005–06, 2006–07, 2007–08, 2016–17, 2017–18, 2020/21
Egypt Mortabat Basketball League: 9 wins
Winners  : 2013–14, 2015–16, 2016–17, 2017–18, 2018–2019, 2019-2020, 2020-2021, 2021–2022, 2022-2023

Arab Leagues 

Arab Women's Club Basketball Championship: 1
  Champions : 1996
  Runners-up : 1999, 2002, 2018
  Third place : 1995, 2000

Sports Hall information
 

Name: – Al Ahly Sports Hall
City: – Cairo
Capacity: – 2500

Current team roster

Transfers 

Transfers for the 2018–19 season:

Joining
  Thoriya Mohamed from  shooting club

Leaving
  Sara Elmagraby (retire)

Technical and managerial staff

Kit manufacturers and shirt sponsors

Club Presidents

See also
 Al Ahly FC
 Al Ahly (volleyball)
 Al Ahly Women's Volleyball
 Al Ahly (basketball)
 Al Ahly Women's Basketball
 Al Ahly (handball)
 Al Ahly Women's Handball
 Al Ahly (table tennis)
 Al Ahly (water polo)
 Port Said Stadium riot
 Al-Ahly TV

References

External links
Eurobasket.com
Presentation on AfricaBasket.com
Twitter Account
Facebook Account
Al Ahly website
Fan website
Fan page

Basketball
Basketball teams in Egypt
Arab women